Seiko Epson Corporation, or simply known as Epson, is a Japanese multinational electronics company and one of the world's largest manufacturers of computer printers and information- and imaging-related equipment. Headquartered in Suwa, Nagano, Japan, the company has numerous subsidiaries worldwide and manufactures inkjet, dot matrix, thermal and laser printers for consumer, business and industrial use, scanners, laptop and desktop computers, video projectors, watches, point of sale systems, robots and industrial automation equipment, semiconductor devices, crystal oscillators, sensing systems and other associated electronic components. The company has developed as one of manufacturing and research & development companies (formerly known as Seikosha) of the former Seiko Group, a name traditionally known for manufacturing Seiko timepieces since its founding. Seiko Epson was one of the major companies in the Seiko Group, but is neither a subsidiary nor an affiliate of Seiko Group Corporation.

History

Origins
The roots of Seiko Epson Corporation go back to a company called Daiwa Kogyo, Ltd. which was founded in May 1942 by Hisao Yamazaki, a local clock shop owner and former employee of K. Hattori, in Suwa, Nagano, Japan. Daiwa Kogyo was supported by an investment from the Hattori family (founder of the Seiko Group) and began as a manufacturer of watch parts for Daini Seikosha (currently Seiko Instruments). The company started operation in a  renovated miso storehouse with 22 employees.

In 1943, Daini Seikosha established a factory in Suwa for manufacturing Seiko watches with Daiwa Kogyo. In 1959, the Suwa Factory of Daini Seikosha was split up and merged into Daiwa Kogyo to form Suwa Seikosha Co., Ltd: the forerunner of the Seiko Epson Corporation. The company has developed many timepiece technologies. In particular, it developed the world's first portable quartz timer (Seiko QC-951) in 1963, the world's first quartz watch (Seiko Quartz Astron 35SQ) in 1969, the first automatic power generating quartz watch (Seiko Auto-Quartz) in 1988 and the Spring Drive watch movement in 1999.

The watch business is the root of the company’s ultra-precision machining and micromechatronics technologies and still one of the major businesses for Seiko Epson today although it accounts for a few percent of total revenues. The watches made by the company are sold through the Seiko Watch Corporation, a subsidiary of Seiko Group Corporation. The watch brand of Orient Watch/Orient Star are owned by Epson since 2009 (fully integrated into the company in 2017).

Printers

In 1961, Suwa Seikosha established a company called Shinshu Seiki Co. as a subsidiary to supply precision parts for Seiko watches. When the Seiko Group was selected to be the official time keeper for the 1964 Summer Olympics in Tokyo, a printing timer was required to time events, and Shinshu Seiki started developing an electronic printer.

In September 1968, Shinshu Seiki launched the world's first mini-printer, the EP-101 ("EP" for Electronic Printer,) which was soon incorporated into many calculators. In June 1975, the name Epson was coined for the next generation of printers based on the EP-101 which was released to the public. The name EPSON was coined by joining the initials EP, meaning Electronic Printer, and the word “son”, making EPSON mean “Electronic Printer’s Son”. In April of the same year Epson America Inc. was established to sell printers for Shinshu Seiki Co.

In June 1978, the TX-80 (TP-80), eighty-column dot-matrix printer was released to the market, and was mainly used as a system printer for the Commodore PET Computer. After two years of further development, an improved model, the MX-80 (MP-80), was launched in October 1980. It was soon described in the company's advertising as the best selling printer in the United States.

In July 1982, Shinshu Seiki officially named itself the Epson Corporation and launched the world's first handheld computer, HX-20 (HC-20), and in May 1983 the world's first portable color LCD TV was developed and launched by the company.

In November 1985, Suwa Seikosha Co., Ltd. and the Epson Corporation merged to form Seiko Epson Corporation.

The company developed the Micro Piezo inkjet technology, which used a piezoelectric crystal in each nozzle and did not heat the ink at the print head while spraying the ink onto the page, and released Epson MJ-500 inkjet cartridge (Epson Stylus 800 printer) in March 1993. Shortly after in 1994, Epson released the first high resolution color inkjet printer (720×720 dpi was considered as a high resolution), the Epson Stylus Color (P860A) utilizing the Micro Piezo head technology. Newer models of the Stylus series employed Epson’s special DURABrite ink. They also had two hard drives. The HD 850 and the HD 860 MFM interface. The specifications are reference The WINN L. ROSCH Hardware bible 3rd addition SAMS publishing.

In 1994, Epson started outsourcing sales reps to help sell their products in retail stores in the United States. The same year, they started the Epson Weekend Warrior sales program. The purpose of the program was to help improve sales, improve retail sales reps' knowledge of Epson products and to address Epson customer service in a retail environment. Reps were assigned on weekend shift, typically around 12–20 hours a week. Epson started the Weekend Warrior program with TMG Marketing (now Mosaic Sales Solutions), later with Keystone Marketing Inc, then to Mosaic, and now with Campaigners INC. The Mosaic contract expired with Epson on June 24, 2007 and Epson is now represented by Campaigners, Inc. The sales reps of Campaigners, Inc. are not outsourced as Epson hired "rack jobbers" to ensure their retail customers displayed products properly. This frees up their regular sales force to concentrate on profitable sales solutions to VAR's and system integrators, leaving "retail" to reps who did not require sales skills.

Personal computers
Starting in 1983, Epson entered the personal computer market with the QX-10, a CP/M-compatible Z80 machine. By 1986, the company had shifted to the growing PC compatible market with the Equity line. Epson withdrew from the international PC market in 1996. The company still produces and sells PCs in Japan as of 2022.

21st century

In June 2003, the company became public following their listing on the 1st section of the Tokyo Stock Exchange. Since 2017 the company is a constituent of the Nikkei Stock Average index. Although Seiko Group Corporation (f/k/a K. Hattori, Hattori Seiko, Seiko Holdings) and the key members of the Hattori family still hold approximately 10% of the outstanding shares of Seiko Epson, the company is managed and operated completely independently from Seiko Group.

Seiko Watch Corporation, a division of Seiko Group Corporation, produces Seiko timepieces in-house through its subsidiaries as well as delegates the manufacture of some of its high-end watches (Seiko Astron, Grand Seiko, Credor, etc) to Epson. The company makes some of the Seiko's highest grade watches at the Micro Artist Studio inside its Shiojiri Plant in Shiojiri, Nagano. Beside the Seiko timepieces, Epson develops, designs, manufactures, markets, and sells watches under its own brands such as Trume, Orient, and Orient Star.

In 2004, Epson introduced their R-D1 digital RangeFinder Camera, which supports Leica M mount and Leica screw mount M39 lenses with an adapter ring. This camera is the first digital rangefinder on the market. Because its sensor is smaller than that of the standard 35 mm film frame, lenses mounted on the R-D1 have the field view 1.53 times as long as that of the standard 35 mm camera. As of 2006 the R-D1 has been replaced by the R-D1s. The R-D1s is less expensive but its hardware is identical. Epson has released a firmware patch to bring the R-D1 up to the full functionality of its successor—the first digital camera manufacturer to make such an upgrade available for free.

In September 2012, Epson introduced a printer called the Epson Expression Premium XP-800 Small-in-One. It has the ability to print wirelessly. Furthermore, the name Expression has followed various models of scanners.

In September 2015 Epson debuted a printer, the Epson ET-4550 which instead of print cartridges, enables the user to pour the ink into separate inkwells from ink bottles. In the third quarter of 2012, Epson's global market share in the sale of printers, copiers and multifunction devices amounted to 15.20 percent.

Epson is also involved in the smartglasses market. Since 2016 the company has three different models. First up was the Epson Moverio BT-100 which was followed up by the Epson Moverio BT-200. In 2016 the company also released the Moverio Pro BT-2000 which is an enterprise oriented, upgraded version of the BT-200 with stereoscopic cameras. The company also was the first to release consumer smart glasses with see through optics that made them very popular under drone pilots for being able to get a first person view while still being able to see the drone in the sky.

2016 Epson presented the SureColor SC-P10000 ink printer: it prints with inks in ten colours and up to 44 inch (1,11 m).

ESC/P

To control its printers, Epson introduced a printer control language, the Epson Standard Code for Printers or (ESC/P), which became a de facto industry standard for controlling print formatting during the era of dot matrix printers; whose popularity was initially started by the Epson MX-80.

Robots 

Epson Robots is the robotics design and manufacturing department of Epson. Seiko Epson produces some microcontrollers, such as the S1C63. In 1980 Epson started the production of robots.

Ink cartridge controversies 
In July 2003, a Dutch consumer association advised its 640,000 members to boycott Epson inkjet printers. The Netherlands-based organisation alleged that Epson customers were unfairly charged for ink they could never use. Later that month, however, the group retracted its call for a nationwide boycott of Epson products and issued a statement conceding that residual ink left in Epson cartridges was necessary for the printers to function properly.

Epson designed ink to be left in the cartridges (and in fact they have done so ever since they developed the piezo-electric head) due to the way the capping mechanism worked. If the capping mechanism dries out, then the heads risk getting clogged, and thus an expensive repair will be necessary. The reason that the Dutch consumer association retracted their statement was that, as pointed out, Epson had made a statement regarding how many pages (at usually a 5% coverage of an A4 sheet of paper) each cartridge could sustain for printing.

Nonetheless, Epson America, Inc. settled a class action lawsuit brought before the Los Angeles Superior Court. It did not admit guilt, but they agreed to refund $45 to anyone who purchased an Epson inkjet printer after April 8, 1999 (at least $20 of which must be used at Epson's E-Store).

According to IDG News Service, Epson filed a complaint with the U.S. International Trade Commission (ITC) in February, 2006, against 24 companies that manufactured, imported, or distributed Epson-compatible ink cartridges for resale in the U.S. On March 30, 2007, ITC judge Paul Luckern issued an initial determination that the ink cartridges in question did infringe upon Epson's patents. The judge also recommended those companies and others to be barred from manufacturing, importing, or reselling Epson cartridges in the U.S., said Epson.

In 2015 it emerged that Epson printers reported that cartridges are empty when in fact 20% of their ink remains.

See also
 Inkjet technology

References

External links

 

 

Japanese companies established in 1942
2003 initial public offerings
Manufacturing companies based in Tokyo
Electronics companies established in 1942
Companies listed on the Tokyo Stock Exchange
Computer printer companies
Display technology companies
Electronics companies of Japan
Japanese brands
Point of sale companies
Robotics companies of Japan
Watch brands
Watch manufacturing companies of Japan